First Step may refer to:

 First Step (CNBLUE album), 2011
 First Step (Faces album), 1970
 First Step (Mount Everest), the first of the Three Steps, prominent rocky steps on the northeast ridge of Mount Everest
 RSS First Step, a Blue Origin space capsule for the New Shepard launch vehicle
 The first of the Twelve Steps in a twelve-step addiction recovery program

See also
 The First Step (disambiguation)
 First Steps (disambiguation)